Interstate 880 (I-880) is a north–south auxiliary Interstate Highway in the San Francisco Bay Area of Northern California. It runs from I-280 and State Route 17 (SR 17) in San Jose to I-80 and I-580 in Oakland, running parallel to the eastern shore of San Francisco Bay. For most of its route, I-880 is officially known as the Nimitz Freeway, after World War II fleet admiral Chester W. Nimitz, who retired to the Bay Area. The northernmost  is also commonly referred to as the Cypress Freeway, after the former alignment of the freeway and its subsequent replacement.

Route description

The southern terminus of I-880 is at its interchange with I-280 and SR 17 in San Jose. From there, it heads roughly northeast past San Jose International Airport to US Route 101 (US 101). The Nimitz Freeway then turns northwest, running parallel to the southeastern shore of San Francisco Bay, connecting the cities of Milpitas, Fremont, Newark, Union City, Hayward, and San Leandro before reaching Oakland. In Oakland, I-880 passes by Oakland International Airport, Oakland Coliseum, the Port of Oakland, and Downtown Oakland. The northern terminus of I-880 is in Oakland at the junction with I-80 and I-580 (known as the MacArthur Maze), near the eastern approach of the San Francisco–Oakland Bay Bridge.

I-880 is part of the California Freeway and Expressway System and is part of the National Highway System, a network of highways that are considered essential to the country's economy, defense, and mobility by the Federal Highway Administration (FHWA). Officially, the Nimitz Freeway designation is Route 880 from Route 101 to Route 80, as named by Senate Concurrent Resolution 23, Chapter 84 in 1958.

Since the late 1990s, an infamous misconception for certain commuters and businesses in San Jose is that I-880 extends from I-280 to SR 85 in Los Gatos (which would extend the length to ).

Express lanes
High-occupancy toll (HOT) lanes along I-880 between the Milpitas–Fremont line at Dixon Landing Road and Lewelling Boulevard in San Lorenzo opened in October 2020. The southbound express lanes extend north to Hegenberger Road in Oakland and south to SR 237 in Milpitas.

, the HOT lanes' hours of operation is weekdays between 5:00 am and 8:00 pm. Solo drivers are tolled using a congestion pricing system based on the real-time levels of traffic. Two-person carpools and clean air vehicles with a solo driver are charged 50 percent of the posted toll. Carpools with three or more people and motorcycles are not charged. All tolls are collected using an open road tolling system, and therefore there are no toll booths to receive cash. Each vehicle is required to carry either a FasTrak Flex or CAV (Clean Air Vehicle) transponder, with its switch set to indicate the number of the vehicle's occupants (one, two, three, or more). Solo drivers may also use the FasTrak standard tag without the switch. Drivers without any FasTrak tag will be assessed a toll violation regardless of whether they qualified for free.

History

The state legislature added the proposed San Jose–Richmond East Shore Highway to the state highway system in 1933, and it became an extension of the previously short (San Rafael to the bay) Legislative Route (LRN) 69, and part of Sign Route 13 (soon changed to 17) in 1934. From San Jose, this route temporarily followed existing LRN 5 (present Oakland Road, Main Street, Milpitas Boulevard, and Warm Springs Boulevard) to SR 21 at Warm Springs and then continued along existing county roads and city streets, now known as Fremont Boulevard, Alvarado Boulevard, Hesperian Boulevard, Lewelling Boulevard, Washington Avenue, 14th Street, 44th Avenue, 12th Street, 14th Avenue, 8th Street, and 7th Street, into Downtown Oakland. It then turned north at Cypress Street (now Mandela Parkway), passing through the MacArthur Maze and following a newly constructed alignment (signed as US 40) to El Cerrito.

The first short piece of the new Eastshore Freeway opened to traffic on July 22, 1949, connecting Oak Street downtown with 23rd Avenue. It was extended to 98th Avenue on June 1, 1950, Lewelling Boulevard on June 13, 1952, and Jackson Street (SR 92) on June 5, 1953. At the San Jose end, the overlap with Route 5 between Bayshore Highway (US 101) and Warm Springs was bypassed on July 2, 1954. Within Oakland, the double-decker Cypress Street Viaduct opened on June 11, 1957, connecting the freeway with the San Francisco–Oakland Bay Bridge. The Oakland segment was extended south to Fremont Boulevard at Beard Road on November 14, 1957, and the gap was filled on November 24, 1958, soon after the state legislature named the highway after Fleet Admiral Chester W. Nimitz. (The short spur to Route 5 at Warm Springs (now SR 262) remained in the state highway system as a branch of Route 69.) As these sections opened, Sign Route 17 (and LRN 69) was moved from its old surface routing, which mostly became local streets. Other than Route 5 south of Warm Springs, the portion from San Leandro into Oakland was also kept as part of Route 105 (now SR 185).

Historic alignments

SR 17

Prior to 1984, the route known as I-880 used to be part of SR 17, which was US 48 from current I-238 to US 101 from 1926 to 1931, then US 101E from 1929 to the mid-1930s. SR 17 used to run from Santa Cruz all the way through San Jose, Oakland, and then continued north via the Eastshore Freeway (I-80) through Richmond to the Richmond–San Rafael Bridge and San Rafael.

In 1984, the segment of SR 17 from I-280 in San Jose to the MacArthur Maze in Oakland was renumbered as I-880, and the portion of SR 17 from the MacArthur Maze to San Rafael was renumbered as part of I-580.

Nimitz Freeway
In 1947, construction commenced on a freeway to replace the street routing of SR 17 through the East Bay. The new freeway was named the "Eastshore Freeway", and, with the subsequent addition of a freeway to replace the Eastshore Highway north of the MacArthur Maze in the mid 1950s, it ran, appropriately, almost the entire length of the east shore of San Francisco Bay. In 1958, following a joint resolution of the California State Legislature, the portion south of the MacArthur Maze was renamed the Nimitz Freeway in honor of WWII Admiral Nimitz, while the portion to the north retained the name Eastshore Freeway. The formal dedication, with the participation of Admiral Nimitz, took place on August 12, 1958.

Historic US 50 Bus.

The northern portion of I-880 was designated US 50 Business (US 50 Bus.) for a time between the I-80 interchange and Downtown Oakland.

Original routing in Sacramento

From 1971 to 1983, I-880 was the original route designation for the Beltline Freeway, the northern bypass freeway for the Sacramento area. This freeway begins in West Sacramento as a fork from the original I-80, continues northeast over the Sacramento River to its interchange with I-5, continues east through the communities of North Sacramento and Del Paso Heights, and ends at an interchange with the Roseville Freeway (I-80). The now-designated Capital City Freeway was then the original I-80 routing, continuing southwest directly into Downtown Sacramento. I-80 was then rerouted along the Beltline Freeway in 1983, while the Capital City Freeway became I-80 Bus.

Modern history

Cypress Viaduct and the 1989 Loma Prieta earthquake

A large double-decker section in Oakland, known as the Cypress Street Viaduct, collapsed during the 1989 Loma Prieta earthquake, causing 42 deaths; initial estimates were significantly higher, but, because many commuters on both sides of the bay had left early or stayed late to watch Game 3 of the San Francisco–Oakland World Series, the freeway was far less crowded than normal at the time of the quake. This was the greatest loss of life caused by that earthquake. Rebuilding the affected section of the freeway took nearly a decade, due to environmental impact concerns, the feeling that the freeway divided the neighborhood, design considerations, and, most importantly, a huge outcry from the West Oakland community demanding that the freeway find a new route–not in West Oakland. The protest was successful. The freeway reopened in July 1997 on a new route parallel to railroad tracks around the outskirts of West Oakland with the entire project being opened in 1999 and fully completed in 2001, with the replacement taking on the commonly referred to name of Cypress Freeway, much like the former double-decker freeway.

The former path of the structure, Cypress Street, was renamed Mandela Parkway, and the median where the freeway stood became a landscaped linear park.

Flood plains
Several aspects of the I-880 facility have been constructed in designated floodplains such as the 1990 and 2004 interchange improvements at Dixon Landing Road. In that case, the FHWA was required to make a finding that there was no feasible alternative to the new ramp system as designed. In that same study, the FHWA produced an analysis to support the fact that adequate wetlands mitigation had been designed into the improvement project.

Sound barriers
Due to high sound levels generated from this highway and the relatively dense urban development in the highway corridor, the California Department of Transportation (Caltrans) has conducted numerous studies to retrofit the right-of-way with noise barriers. This activity has occurred in Oakland, San Leandro, Hayward, Newark, and Fremont. During the 1989 widening of I-880 in parts of Newark and Fremont, scientific studies were conducted to determine the need for sound walls and to design optimum heights to achieve Federal noise standards.

No interchange with SR 87/Guadalupe Freeway
Between Coleman Avenue and 1st Street in San Jose, SR 87 (Guadalupe Freeway) crosses above I-880 without an interchange, making it the only point in California where two freeways cross without a connection. Because of its proximity to the runways at San Jose International Airport, Caltrans cannot construct elevated ramps without them interfering with flight paths. Tunneling underneath to build underground ramps would also make a significant environmental impact to the nearby Guadalupe River.

Gasoline tanker accident in 2007

On April 29, 2007, a gasoline tanker overturned and caught fire on the connector between westbound I-80 and southbound I-880 on the MacArthur Maze interchange. The fire caused major damage to both this connector and one directly above (eastbound I-80 onto eastbound I-580). The overpass was replaced and reopened 27 days later. The governor, Arnold Schwarzenegger, declared it as a state of emergency and all public transportation was free on the first commute day.

2012–2015 I-880/I-280 interchange improvement
Improvements to the I-280/I-880 and Stevens Creek Boulevard interchanges finished early 2015. Before construction, both interchanges shared a handful of ramps, but now, the two interchanges will be independent from one another. Construction began in late 2012 and the ramp from I-280 north to I-880 north opened in April 2015.

I-880 Corridor Improvement Project
The I-880 Corridor Improvement Project, one of the last seismic retrofit projects of a major transportation corridor in California, consisted of eight separate projects located in a  segment of the freeway between Oakland and Hayward.

The overall goal of the project was to improve the seismic safety of the corridor. After the 1989 Loma Prieta earthquake, Caltrans initiated Phase 1 of its seismic retrofit program. After the 1994 Northridge earthquake, Caltrans initiated Phase 2 of its seismic retrofit program, which included projects along the I-880 corridor. Other goals include reducing traffic congestion and improving road quality.

The individual projects included in the I-880 Corridor Improvement Project were retrofitting or replacing the 5th Avenue, 23rd Avenue, 29th Avenue, Fruitvale Avenue, and High Street bridges in Oakland; improvements to both the I-238 and SR 92 interchanges (the latter, a four-year project, completed in October 2011); and an overall rehabilitation/repaving project along the entire segment. Construction began in 2006, although certain projects were completed in 2020. The total cost of the project is $462.7 million (equivalent to $ in ), provided by federal, state, and regional funds.

Exit list

See also

References

External links

Bay Area FasTrak – includes toll information on the I-880 Express Lanes and the other Bay Area toll facilities
AARoads - I-880 Guide
The October 17, 1989, Loma Prieta, California, Earthquake—Selected Photographs - U.S. Geological Survey
Oakland Cypress Viaduct
Cypress Street Viaduct includes map of old MacArthur Maze with old U.S. Route 40/U.S. Route 50 designations
Cypress Viaduct Reconstruction from Federal Highway Administration
Caltrans: Route 880 highway conditions
California Highways: I-880

80-8
880
80-8
8
Interstate 80-8
Interstate 80-8
Transportation in Hayward, California